Sue Huff was a politician from Alberta, Canada. She was the acting leader of the Alberta Party from November 23, 2010, to May 28, 2011. She served as an elected public school trustee for the city of Edmonton from 2007 to 2010.

Political career
In 2007 Huff ran for a seat as a trustee to the Edmonton Public School Board in Ward C. She defeated incumbent Don Williams in a two-way race taking over 60% of the popular vote. She served a single term in office and did not seek re-election.

Huff was appointed as interim leader of the Alberta Party on November 23, 2010, replacing Edwin Erickson who had announced his resignation at the October 2010 annual general meeting. She served as leader until the party's leadership convention on May 28, 2011, in Edmonton. Following the convention, Huff returned to her position as a director on the provincial board and sought the nomination to run as the Alberta Party candidate in her home constituency of Edmonton-Glenora. In June 2011, Huff was nominated the Alberta Party candidate for Edmonton Glenora. In September 2011, Huff left her position on the board to focus on her campaign. She received 8.97% of the vote in Edmonton-Glenora in the 2012 provincial election.

Election results

References

External links
Alberta Party
Sue Huff for Edmonton Glenora

Leaders of the Alberta Party
Politicians from Edmonton
Living people
1960s births
British emigrants to Canada
Female Canadian political party leaders
Women in Alberta politics